KURT (93.7 FM) is a radio station licensed to serve the community of Prineville, Oregon. The station is owned by David Harms and Brent Hample, through licensee H&H Broadcasting, LLC, and broadcasts H&H's Christian worship format known as "Worship 24/7".

The station was assigned the KURT call letters by the Federal Communications Commission on December 10, 2015.

References

External links
 

Radio stations established in 2018
2018 establishments in Oregon
Prineville, Oregon
URT